Cristian Rafael Mora Medrano (born August 26, 1979) is a retired Ecuadorian football goalkeeper.

Club career

Mora once attended Colegio de las Hermanas Betlemitas and first played in Cóndor Futbol Club of San Miguel as goalkeeper at an early age. He also played for the San Miguel's city team in the Provincial Games and was picked as goalkeeper for the province team to play the national teen/amateur championship in Ecuador. Mora was then discovered and invited to train in Olmedo, while playing as goalkeeper in a friendly match against his college Escuela Politécnica de Riobamba.

On July 15, 2014, it was confirmed that Mora would go on loan to Hong Kong Premier League side South China.

International career

Mora has made 20 appearances for the Ecuador national team, and made his first full-fledged senior appearance against Italy, a friendly match played in New Jersey. The game ended in a 1–1 draw and to Mora's credit, his penalty save from superstar Luca Toni forced many to take notice, including Luis Fernando Suarez, Ecuador's former Colombian coach.

He played first choice goalkeeper for the Ecuador national team during 2005's 2006 FIFA World Cup qualification. In the 2006 World Cup, Mora played all four matches before his team was eliminated in the Round of 16 by England. Mora allowed 4 goals but kept clean sheets against Poland and Costa Rica. However, due to poor friendly results and a bad Copa America 2007 he has failed to break with the national team.

Titles
LDU Quito
Serie A: 2005 Apertura, 2007

References

External links
 Mora's FEF Player Card

1979 births
Living people
People from Vinces Canton
Association football goalkeepers
Ecuadorian footballers
C.D. Olmedo footballers
C.D. ESPOLI footballers
C.S.D. Macará footballers
L.D.U. Quito footballers
C.D. El Nacional footballers
C.D. Universidad Católica del Ecuador footballers
C.D. Cuenca footballers
South China AA players
Ecuador international footballers
2006 FIFA World Cup players
2007 Copa América players
Hong Kong First Division League players
Ecuadorian expatriate footballers
Expatriate footballers in Hong Kong